Clivina sasajii is a species of ground beetle in the subfamily Scaritinae. It was described by Ball in 2001.

References

sasajii
Beetles described in 2001